A  prazo (or prazo da coroa) was a large estate leased to colonists, settlers and traders in Portuguese Africa to exploit the continent's resources. Prazos operated like semi-feudal entities and were most commonly found in the Zambezi River valley.

The prazo was a land grant or lease given in exchange for a fixed annual fee based on laws promulgated by the medieval kings of Portugal, Afonso V and Manuel I, and established in Portuguese Africa in the 17th century. The leaseholder was required to live on the grant and could not sell or sub-let it, although this was frequently violated. In Tete Province during the 19th century, 32 prazeros owned 57 prazos. The land grant was not to exceed 500 leagues in length although most exceeded this limit. In 1677 a system was adopted to attract white Portuguese settlers. Vacant prazos were to be granted to "deserving orphan girls or the daughters of crown servants", who would pass the prazo on to her eldest daughter for three generations who were married to Portuguese men. At that time the government could take control of the prazo or renew the lease.

The prazero was allowed to employ Africans (colonos); raise a private army, often made up of slaves; trade in all commodities; and maintain law and order in the prazo. The Portuguese Crown intended the prazo to guarantee control over the land, stimulate agricultural production, facilitate European settlement and be a source of revenue for the government, but the system failed in the objectives. Contributions to the failure were rampant absenteeism, violent rivalries between the grantees, the scarcity of Portuguese women, lack of capital and resistance by the Africans, of which the latter cause was probably the most important. The prazo system's concepts of female inheritance, three lives and individual landownership were alien to African traditions.

The government attempted to reform the system in the mid-19th century, but failed to do so. Another attempt was made in the 1890s with no different results, but the introduction of the concessionaire companies about that time, the 1890 British Ultimatum and the Portuguese Colonial Act of 1930 contributed to the end of the prazo.

References

Sources

Newitt, Malyn D. D. "The Portuguese on the Zambezi: An Historical Interpretation of the Prazo System". The Journal of African History 10, 1 (1969): 67–85.

Further reading 
Isaacman, Allen F. Mozambique: The Africanization of a European Institution—The Zambesi Prazos, 1750–1902. Madison: University of Wisconsin Press, 1972.
Newitt, Malyn D. D. Portuguese Settlement on the Zambesi: Exploration, Land Tenure and Colonial Rule in East Africa. New York: Africana, 1973.

Agriculture in Africa